Steeve François Fabien Guénot (born 2 October 1985 in Chalon-sur-Saône, Saône-et-Loire) is a French wrestler who won the gold medal in the Men's Greco-Roman 66 kg in the 2008 Summer Olympics in Beijing.  He became the first Olympic Champion for France in Men's Greco-Roman Wrestling since Emile Poilvé, in the 1936 Olympic Games in Berlin.
Hired by the RATP in 2007, he is member of the US Métro (Union sportive métropolitaine des transports).

He is born in a family of wrestlers: his father is a referee and his mother is a club manager. His brother Christophe and sisters also practice wrestling.

At the age of 22, he gave France its first gold medal at the 2008 Summer Olympics.

At the 2012 Summer Olympics, he attempted to defend his gold medal. In the quarter-finals, he was declared the winner against the reigning world champion, Saeid Abdevali of Iran, in what was widely regarded as a controversial decision by the referee  and judges. Guénot, however, was defeated in the semifinal by the eventual champion and ended up winning the bronze medal.

His brother, Christophe Guénot, also won a bronze medal in the -74 kg category.

References

External links
 

1985 births
Living people
People from Chalon-sur-Saône
French male sport wrestlers
Olympic wrestlers of France
Wrestlers at the 2008 Summer Olympics
Olympic medalists in wrestling
Wrestlers at the 2012 Summer Olympics
Olympic bronze medalists for France
Olympic gold medalists for France
Medalists at the 2012 Summer Olympics
Medalists at the 2008 Summer Olympics
World Wrestling Championships medalists
Sportspeople from Saône-et-Loire
Mediterranean Games bronze medalists for France
Mediterranean Games medalists in wrestling
Competitors at the 2013 Mediterranean Games
European Wrestling Championships medalists
21st-century French people